The 1987 California Golden Bears football team was an American football team that represented the University of California, Berkeley in the Pacific-10 Conference (Pac-10) during the 1987 NCAA Division I-A football season. In their first year under head coach Bruce Snyder, the Golden Bears compiled a 3–6–2 record (2–3–2 against Pac-10 opponents), finished in eighth place in the Pac-10, and were outscored by their opponents by a combined total of 267 to 239.

The team's statistical leaders included Troy Taylor with 2,081 passing yards, Chris Richards with 668 rushing yards, and Brian Bedford with 515 receiving yards.

Schedule

Roster

References

California
California Golden Bears football seasons
California Golden Bears football